The German Krah AG does production and installation of pipe production plants for plastic pipe in diameters up to 4000 mm. Currently, it is headquartered in Schutzbach, Germany.

History
The family-owned company has a 40-year history rooted in a small engineering company specializing in the design of small machines and tools, founded by Karl-Heinz Krah in 1968 in Westerwald. Over time, the company has developed from a small workshop and "one man show" to a worldwide manufacturer of specialized machines in pipe production plants for big diameters of non pressure plastic pipes, as well as plastic pressure pipes. The company is still family-managed, currently by Alexander Krah, the youngest son of Karl-Heinz Krah. The company has production facilities in Spain, Croatia, Germany, Argentina, USA, Kuwait, Oman and Mexico. In 2007 an Arab investor injected money in cash for a 50% share in the company. The remaining shares are held equally by Karl-Heinz Krah and Alexander Krah.

References

External links
 Krah AG

Manufacturing companies of Germany